SS Arthur M. Hulbert was a Liberty ship built in the United States during World War II. She was named after Arthur M. Hulbert, a leader of the 4-H Club in New Jersey.

Construction
Arthur M. Hulbert was laid down on 4 November 1944, under a Maritime Commission (MARCOM) contract, MC hull 2389, by J.A. Jones Construction, Brunswick, Georgia; she was launched on 6 December 1944.

History
She was allocated to Alcoa Steamship Co., Inc., on 16 December 1944. On 16 October 1948, she was laid up in the National Defense Reserve Fleet, in Beaumont, Texas. On 30 June 1967, she was sold for $45,188.88, to Southern Scrap Materials Co., Ltd., for scrapping. She was removed from the fleet on 19 January 1967.

References

Bibliography

 
 
 
 
 

 

Liberty ships
Ships built in Brunswick, Georgia
1944 ships
Beaumont Reserve Fleet